Hayk Gyolchanyan (born November 22, 1982) is an Armenian-American record producer, musician, singer and songwriter. He is best known as the founder of the Armenian prog-rock band IF as well as a record producer and the founder of RedPoint Records. During his career he worked with many representatives of Armenian and Russian show business as a composer, session musician and record producer. 
After moving to New York City Gyolchanyan started his solo career in United States with his first single Melon Fields released on February 20, 2020.

Early life
Hayk Gyolchanyan was born in Soviet Armenia, in Leninakan on November 22, 1982, to process engineers Fyodor and Gayane Gyolchanyan. At the age of five Hayk started to develop interest in music spending most of the time listening to old vinyl records. After the 1988 earthquake his family moved to Yerevan. 
After graduating from the College of Mathematics and Physics at high school number 114, he went to the State Engineering University of Armenia (former Polytechnic Institute), faculty of applied sociology and psychology, however soon dropped out and joined the army. Between 2001 and 2003 he was the head of Mardakert military band during military service in the Nagorno-Karabakh Defense Army. In December 2003 moved to Moscow where he built his sound engineering and television career and founded his record label RedPoint Records. In December 2014 moved to New York City.

Career

1993–2003: Armenia

When Gyolchanyan was 8 years old he heard the song Love Me Do by The Beatles for the first time. This was a turning point in Gyolchanyan's life. Obsessed by the "Fab Four" he started taking guitar lessons and shortly after along with his cousin Henry Karagyozyan and friends Koryun Bobikyan and Suren Sargsyan formed a Beatles cover band named "The Beetles". At the age of 9 Hayk wrote his first song "Love at First Sight" which was performed live on one the regular gigs the band had on the stage of Union of Architects. By the end of 1996 the band decided to reorganize and focus more on original content written primarily by Hayk Gyolchanyan and Henry Karagyozyan. In 1997 the new band takes the name "IF" and starts working on the new material, however due to creative differences the band splits in two with "IF" led by Gyolchanyan and "The Kings’ Cross" led by Karagyozyan. In 1998 both bands played their debut performances at the Armenian Center for Contemporary Experimental Art (NPAK) thus forming the so-called 5th waive of Armenian Rock. The show's success lead to NPAK management later that year organizing the biggest rock festival of that time "ROCK’NPAK". In September 1998 Gyolchanyan joins Edgar Barseghyan's newly formed band "Alter Ego" as a drummer, guitarist and keyboardist. In 1999 the band recorded their first self-titled single at the "Brevis Studio" which debuted on local radios in February 2000. 
With the support of Armenian rock pioneers Vostan Hayots the band was playing regular sets in the first rock club in Yerevan. Until late 2001 IF, Alter Ego and The Kings’ Cross, were actively performing shows in local rock clubs, concert halls and festivals. Hitting a dead end in music career Gyolchanyan decided to move to Moscow for a bigger market. Not willing to wait another 5 years he drops out of the college and joins the army which was only a 2-year setback. In the Nagorno-Karabakh Defense Army he masters trumpet and soon becomes the head of Mardakert military orchestra. During the military service Gyolchanyan participates in multiple local and international music festivals taking only first places in "best popular music performance" nomination and received the rank of sergeant.

2004–2014: Russia
In December 2003 Gyolchanyan moves to Moscow and within a month puts together a new line up for "IF" which debuted live in February. Gyolchanyan starts working as a sound engineer and manager in one of the local rehearsal bases where founds his first production studio producing young musicians and bands, helping with arrangements and recordings, organizing shows and events. In 2004 IF recorded the debut concept album "Coming Back To Life" primarily containing from the early songs written in the 90s. During the two years in the army a significant number of new songs were written which became the foundation for the new album "Easy Mode" with softer, more pop-rock and folk oriented sound. The album was recorded in late 2004 and was credited to Hayk Gyolchanyan as a solo artist as stylistically it didn't match IF's much heavier prog-rock sound. In 2005 Gyolchanyan starts experimenting with electronic music and releases a comedy mash-up EP "Usta Valod – Armenian Girl". In late 2005 a robbery takes place in Gyolchanyan's studio, the master records of all original recorded albums were lost and the studio shuts down. For the next several years Gyolchanyan is primarily focused on post-production and sound design projects. In 2007 he joins Vostan Hayots as a keyboardist for their 20th anniversary reunion show in Moscow and produces several young bands. In 2008 Gyolchanyan founds "RedPoint Records Studio" and to 2014 works as a composer, sound designer, session musician, producer, TV host and writer on various projects including musical acts, pop stars, movies and TV shows.

2015–present United States
After moving to New York Gyolchanyan starts restoring the lost material from previous albums re-recording the songs based on the little number of demos that survived. His first single Melon Fields (originally recorded in 2004) was released in February 2020 with "Abandoned Hero", "A Sunny Day", "The Sleeplessness", "Take It Easy" and "Me (Part Two)" scheduled to be released by April–July.

Discography 

Albums
 IF – Coming Back To Life (2004) 
 Hayk Gyolchanyan – Easy Mode (Unplugged) (2004)
 Alter Ego – In Conflict (2006)

EP's
 Usta Valod – Armenian Girl (2005)

Singles
 AlterEgo – Alter Ego (1999)
 Hayk Gyolchanyan – Melon Fields (2020)

Filmography

Film

Television

External links
 Official Website

1982 births
Armenian rock musicians
Living people
People from Gyumri
Russian military musicians
Russian record producers
United States military musicians